Grand Theft Audio are a British rock band formed in London, England in 1998. They were signed to London-Sire Records in 1999 and produced their only album at the time Blame Everyone in 2000 until the band split up in 2003 due to the record label being dissolved that year. Their original line-up was ex-3 Colours Red guitarist Chris McCormack, producer and bassist Ralph Jezzard, frontman; vocalist and ex-Real TV star Jay Butler and ex-The Wildhearts drummer Ritch Battersby. The band, minus McCormack, announced on their website page that they were reforming with a new album in the works.

Formation and early years (1997–1999)
Grand Theft Audio were originally known as The Infidels, before the band learned of the existence of several other combos with the same moniker. They formed out of the friendship and musical rapport that had developed while its four members were in separate bands. The band is a play on the action-adventure video game series Grand Theft Auto.

Blame Everyone, break-up and reunion (2000-2009)
The band's first album Blame Everyone was released on 3 October 2000. The album spawned two singles, 'We Luv U' (UK #70) on 24 March 2001 and 'Stoopid Ass' on 23 April 2001. In 2003, the band's record label London-Sire Records went out of business, which eventually caused the band to split up. The band played a one-off reunion concert at the Music Live Exhibition at NEC in Solihull, West Midlands in 2009.

Reform, new music and Pass Me the Conch (2020-present)
In 2020, Jay Butler, Ralph Jezzard and Ritch Battersby decided to reunite after 17 years to release new music. Missing from the reunion was guitarist Chris McCormack, for reasons which the band did not disclose. They released their first single in 20 years titled 'Ruin Your Youth' on 27 November 2020. Their next single, "Another Life", was released on 2 April 2021. Both were released under the record label Technical Foul. The band recently revealed in the About section of their Facebook page that Jezzard had parted ways with the band for personal reasons, making the band a duo act. A new single, 'Ici Mon Decree', was released on 5 November 2021. The band released their second studio album, Pass Me the Conch on 2 September 2022. In the liner notes of the album, former members Jezzard and McCormack were among those who were thanked by the band.

Grand Theft Audio then embarked on a UK tour in September along with CJ Wildheart and Scott Sorry.  And the following month, Grand Theft Audio collaborated with US punk singer, and former Wildheart, Scott Sorry on a cover of Mission of Burma's 'That's When I Reach for My Revolver'. The song, released under the port-manteau moniker of Sorry Audio, was made available via online music platform Bandcamp on 7 October 2022.

Musical style and influences
Frontman Jay Butler said once in an interview when asked about the band's musical style: "In England at the moment, there's a big divide between rock bands, metal bands and electronica bands," Butler notes. "It's like you can't have a song that's catchy if you're a rock band, and you're not supposed to rock if you're an electronica band. But we don't look at music that way, so we took all the little bits that we liked and bastardized them to build the kind of band we wanted to be in. We wanted to create a band that was like all of your favourite bands at the same time." 
We wanted something with lots of hooks, but also with a bit of rock backbone to it, something that was so annoyingly sing along that you either had to love it or hate it. Our bottom line is: does it rock, does it sound good and does it make you want to go out and do something? We don't have any interest in being this week's flavour of the month; we don't want to be a band that's just recognized by journalists and other musicians."

Lineup

Current members
Jay Butler (vocals) (1998–2003, 2009, 2020–present), (guitar) (2020–present)
Ritch Battersby (drums, vocals) (1998–2003, 2009, 2020–present)

Former members
Ralph Jezzard (bass, keyboards, samples, vocals) (1998–2003, 2009, 2020-2021)
Chris McCormack (guitar, vocals) (1998–2003, 2009)

Timeline

Discography

 Blame Everyone (2000)
 Pass Me the Conch (2022)

Soundtrack appearances
'Stoopid Ass' on Dude, Where's My Car? and Hole
'We Luv U' on Dude, Where's My Car? and FIFA 2001
'As Good As It Gets' on Gran Turismo 3: A-Spec (US)
'Wake Up In Your Own Mind' on Gran Turismo 3: A-Spec (PAL/JP)
'Avarice' on Gran Turismo 3: A-Spec (PAL/JP)
'Dead Man Leaving' on Gran Turismo 3: A-Spec (PAL/JP)

References

External links

Musical groups established in 1998
British artists